Glaucoma 1, open angle, I is a protein that in humans is encoded by the GLC1I gene.

References

Further reading